José Ramón Partida Arévalo (born 15 March 1989, in Zapopan, Jalisco) is a former Mexican professional footballer who last played for U. de G. of Ascenso MX.

External links
Ascenso MX

Liga MX players
Living people
1989 births
Mexican footballers
People from Zapopan, Jalisco
Association football defenders
21st-century Mexican people